In mathematics, a Campedelli surface is one of the  surfaces of general type introduced by Campedelli.
Surfaces with the same Hodge numbers are called numerical Campedelli surfaces.

Construction

Invariants

Hodge diamond:

References

Algebraic surfaces
Complex surfaces